Pera Museum (Turkish: Pera Müzesi) is an art museum in the Tepebaşı quarter of the Beyoğlu (Pera) district in Istanbul, Turkey, at Meşrutiyet Avenue No. 65 (adjacent to İstiklal Avenue and in close proximity to Taksim Square.) It has a particular focus on Orientalism in 19th-century art.

History
The Pera Museum was founded by the Suna and İnan Kıraç Foundation in 2005. The museum is located in the historic building of the former Bristol Hotel, which was designed by architect Achille Manoussos and built in 1893. It was renovated between 2003 and 2005 by architect Sinan Genim, who preserved the facade of the building and transformed the interior into a modern and fully equipped museum.

Collection
Pera Museum hosts regular, international loan exhibitions, in addition to holding permanent collections of Orientalist Paintings, Anatolian Weights and Measures, and Kütahya Tiles and Ceramics.

Orientalist Painting Collection
The museum's Orientalist Painting Collection consists of works by European and Ottoman/Turkish artists, including works by Osman Hamdi Bey and his most famous painting, The Tortoise Trainer.

Anatolian Weights and Measures Collection
The Anatolian Weights and Measures Collection comprises over ten thousand pieces and consists of objects dating from prehistory to those used in present-day Anatolia. These comprise the main types of scales and measuring instruments, used for measuring weight, length, and volume in every field, from land measurement to commerce, architecture to jewelry making, shipping to pharmacy.

Kütahya Tiles and Ceramics Collection
The beginnings of the Suna and İnan Kıraç Foundation's Kütahya Tiles and Ceramics Collection date back to 1980s. Today the collection consists of over 800 pieces representing various periods, especially the 18th - 20th centuries. The limited number of pieces on display have been chosen to give a general idea of the collection and the craftsmanship of Kütahya ceramics.

Temporary exhibitions
Having organized joint projects with leading international museums, collections, and foundations including Tate Britain, Centre Pompidou, Victoria and Albert Museum, St. Petersburg Russian State Museum, JP Morgan Chase Collection, New York School of Visual Arts, and the Maeght Foundation, Pera Museum has introduced Turkish audiences to countless internationally acclaimed artists, among them Alberto Giacometti, Jean Dubuffet, Henri Cartier-Bresson, Rembrandt, Niko Pirosmani, Josef Koudelka, Joan Miró, Akira Kurosawa, Marc Chagall, Pablo Picasso, Fernando Botero, Frida Kahlo, Diego Rivera, and Goya.

Since its inauguration, Pera Museum collaborates annually with national and international institutions of art and education to hold exhibitions that support young artists.

Other functions
All of the Museum's exhibitions are accompanied by books, catalogues, concerts, audio-visual events, and education programs. Through seasonal programs and events, Pera Film offers visitors and film buffs a wide range of screenings that extend from classics and independent movies to animated films and documentaries, as well as special shows paralleling the temporary exhibitions’ themes.

See also
 Great Palace Mosaic Museum
 Istanbul Archaeology Museums
 İstanbul Modern
 Rahmi M. Koç Museum
 Sadberk Hanım Museum
 Sakıp Sabancı Museum
 SantralIstanbul

References and notes

Literature
 Pera Museum (ed.). Portraits from the Empire. Pera Museum Publications, 2005. 155 p. ISBN 975 9123 -02 - 9
 Pera Museum (ed.). Young Expansion. Pera Museum Publications, 2005. 163 p. ISBN 975 9123 -00-2

External links

Pera Museum
Pera Müzesi
Virtual tour of the Pera Museum provided by Google Arts & Culture

 Art museums and galleries in Istanbul
 Turkish art
 Art museums established in 2005
 Buildings and structures in Beyoğlu
Koç family
2005 establishments in Turkey